"Heaven" is a song by American singer John Legend. It was written by Legend along with label boss Kanye West, Jessyca Wilson and his brother Vaughn Stevens for his second studio album Once Again (2006). Production was helmed by West, with Legend credited as co-producer. The song samples excerpts from "Heaven Only Knows" (1972) as performed by Monk Higgins. Due to the inclusion of the sample, Milton Bland and Alexandra Louise Brown are also credited as songwriters. The song was released as the album's second single in fall 2006.

A moderate commercial success, "Heaven" reached number 26 on US Billboard Hot R&B/Hip-Hop Songs, but failed to enter the Billboard Hot 100. Released to critical success however, it won Legend his second consecutive Grammy Award for Best Male R&B Vocal Performance at the 49th award ceremony. The song produced two music videos, the first one featuring women posed as various Renaissance era paintings. The second one features more John Legend himself and less posture women. Both videos were shot at Highclere Castle and directed by Hype Williams.

Track listings

Notes
 signifies a co-producer

Personnel
Credits adapted from the liner notes of Once Again.

Andrew Dawson — recording (at Sony Music Studios)
Sharief Hobley — guitar
Anthony Kilhoffer — recording (at Record Plant)
John Legend — co-producer, organ, vocals, writer

Andy Marcinkowski — mixing assistant
Tony Maserati  — mixing
Kanye West — production, writer
Jessyca Wilson — background vocals

Charts

References

External links
 

2006 singles
2006 songs
GOOD Music singles
Sony Music singles
John Legend songs
Music videos directed by Hype Williams
Song recordings produced by Kanye West
Songs written by John Legend
Songs written by Kanye West